Barclay is an unincorporated community in Osage County, Kansas, United States.

History
Barclay was a station on the Atchison, Topeka and Santa Fe Railway.

A post office was opened in Barclay in 1873, and remained in operation until it was discontinued in 1955.

Climate
The climate in this area is characterized by hot, humid summers and generally mild to cool winters.  According to the Köppen Climate Classification system, Barclay has a humid subtropical climate, abbreviated "Cfa" on climate maps.

References

Further reading

External links
 Osage County maps: Current, Historic, KDOT

Unincorporated communities in Osage County, Kansas
Unincorporated communities in Kansas